The 41st Flying Training Squadron is part of the 14th Flying Training Wing based at Columbus Air Force Base, Mississippi.  It operates Beechcraft T-6 Texan II aircraft conducting flight training.

The squadron's mission is to train future Air Force military aviators in Specialized Undergraduate Pilot Training Phase 2 in the T-6A. Additionally, the 41st trains several foreign military pilots each year in the T-6, through both Foreign Military Sales program and the international Aviation Leadership Program. To accomplish its mission, the squadron annually flies over 17,200 sorties and 22,000 flight hours. The squadron also qualifies and sustains 80–90 mission-ready T-6 instructor pilots. The "Flying Buzzsaws" are currently commanded by Lt Col Timothy "Bogey" Thoren.

History
The squadron flew antisubmarine patrols off the coast of Washington from 14 December 1941 – 21 January 1942.

Transferred to the Southwest Pacific theater in early 1942, the 41st  converted to the Bell P-39 Airacobra at Sydney, Australia. Scrambled in response to an attack on Sydney Harbour by Japanese submarines, 1/Lt George Cantello died when his P-39 crashed, soon after takeoff. 
 
On 23 July 1942, the squadron commenced frontline combat sorties in New Guinea, including  air patrols, bomber escort, and close air support. It later converted to the Republic P-47 Thunderbolt. Combat sorties continued until 14 August 1945.

During the Korean War, the squadron flew air defense sorties over Japan. It had been re-designated the 41st Fighter-Interceptor Squadron.  It conducted academic training for pilots and managed the accelerated copilot enrichment training program from, 1990–1991 and has conducted student flight training since 1998.

Lineage
 Constituted as the 41st Pursuit Squadron (Interceptor) on 22 December 1939
 Activated on 1 February 1940
 Redesignated 41st Fighter Squadron on 15 May 1942
 Redesignated 41st Fighter Squadron, Single-Engine on 14 February 1944
 Redesignated 41st Fighter-Interceptor Squadron on 20 January 1950
 Discontinued and inactivated on 8 March 1960
 Redesignated 41st Flying Training Squadron on 1 January 1990
 Activated on 10 January 1990
 Inactivated on 15 May 1991
 Activated on 1 October 1998

Assignments
 31st Pursuit Group, 1 February 1940
 35th Pursuit Group (later 35th Fighter Group, 35th Fighter-Interceptor Group), 15 January 1942 (attached to 6162d Air Base Wing, 1 December 1950 – 25 June 1951)
 327th Air Division, 1 October 1957 – 8 March 1960
 64th Flying Training Wing, 10 January 1990 – 15 May 1991
 14th Operations Group, 1 October 1998 – present

Stations
 Bolling Field, District of Columbia, 1 February 1940
 Selfridge Field, Michigan, 21 October 1940
 Baer Field, Indiana, 6 December 1941
 Paine Field, Washington, c. 15 December 1941 – 21 January 1942
 Archerfield Airport, Australia, 25 February 1942
 Ballarat Airport, Ballarat, Australia, 8 March 1942
 Mount Gambier Airport, Australia, 17 March 1942
 Bankstown Airfield, Australia, 7 April 1942
 Rogers Airfield (30 Mile Drome), Port Moresby, New Guinea, c. 20 July 1942
 Tsili Tsili Airfield, New Guinea, 16 August 1943
 Nadzab Airfield Complex, New Guinea, 22 October 1943
 Gusap Airfield, New Guinea, 15 February 1944
 Nadzab Airfield Complex, New Guinea, 9 June 1944
 Kornasoren Airfield Noemfoor, Schouten Islands, New Guinea, 16 August 1944
 Owi Airfield, Schouten Islands, Netherlands East Indies, 17 September 1944
 Wama Airfield, Morotai, Netherlands East Indies, 17 October 1944
 Mangaldan Airfield, Luzon, Philippines, 21 January 1945
 Lingayen Airfield, Luzon, Philippines, 16 April 1945
 Clark Field, Luzon, Philippines, 20 April 1945
 Yontan Airfield, Okinawa, 30 June 1945
 Irumagawa Air Base, Japan, 10 October 1945
 Yokota Air Base, Japan, c. 25 March 1950
 Johnson Air Base, Japan, 14 August 1950
 Detachments operated from Misawa Air Base, Japan 6 September 1950 – August 1951 and Niigata Air Base, Japan c. 25 May 1951 – 31 October 1954
 Yokota Air Base, Japan, 13 August 1954
 Andersen Air Force Base, Guam, c. 5 August 1956 – 8 March 1960
 Reese Air Force Base, Texas, 10 January 1990 – 15 May 1991
 Columbus Air Force Base, Mississippi, 1 October 1998 – present

Aircraft operated

 Seversky P-35 Guardsman (1940–1941)
 Bell P-39 Airacobra (1941–1943)
 Bell P-400 (1942–1944)
 Lockheed P-38 Lightning (1943)
 Republic P-47 Thunderbolt (1944–1945)
 North American P-51 Mustang (1945–1950)
 Lockheed F-80 Shooting Star (1950–1953)
 North American F-86D Sabre (1953–1960)
 Northrop T-38 Talon (1990–1991)
 Cessna T-37 Tweet (1998–2008)
 Beechcraft T-6 Texan II (2006–present)

References

Notes

Bibliography

External links
 

Military units and formations in Mississippi
0041